George Edward Cruickshank was a provincial politician from Alberta, Canada. He served as a member of the Legislative Assembly of Alberta from 1930 to 1935 sitting as an Independent.

Political career
Cruickshank ran for a seat to the Alberta Legislature in the 1930 Alberta general election as an independent candidate. He defeated two other candidates with a solid majority to win the seat.

Cruickshank ran for a second term in office in the 1935 Alberta general election. He was defeated by Social Credit candidate Ernest Duke finishing a distant fourth place in the field of four candidates.

References

External links
Legislative Assembly of Alberta Members Listing

Independent Alberta MLAs
1877 births
1962 deaths